This is a list of long barrows in the United Kingdom.

England

 Belas Knap, Gloucestershire
 Cat's Brain Long Barrow, Wiltshire 
 Coldrum Long Barrow, Kent
 Fussell's Lodge, Wiltshire
 Foulmere Fen, Cambridgeshire
 Couckoo Ball Long Barrow, Devon
 Butterdon Hill Long Barrow, Dartmoor, Devon 
 Corringdoon Ball Long Barrow, Devon 
 Giants' Hills, Lincolnshire
 Hazleton long barrows, north and south, Gloucestershire
 Julliberrie's Grave, Kent
 Long Barrow, near the Seven Barrows, Berkshire
 Nympsfield Long Barrow, Gloucestershire
 Stoney Littleton Long Barrow, Somerset
 Street House, North Yorkshire
 Uley Long Barrow (aka Hetty Pegler's Tump), Gloucestershire 
 Wayland's Smithy, Oxfordshire
 West Kennet Long Barrow, Wiltshire
 White Barrow, Wiltshire
 Windmill tump, Gloucestershire
 Long barrow, Therfield Heath, Nr Royston, Hertfordshire

Wales

 Ffostyll Long Barrows
 Ty-Isaf Long Barrow
 Cwm Fforest Long Barrow
 Ty Illtyd Long Barrow
 Pen-y-Wyrlod Long Barrow
 Mynydd Troed Long Barrow
 Pipton Long Barrow
 Pen-y-Garn-Goch Long Barrow
 Little Lodge Long Barrow
 Waun Pwtlyn Long Barrow
 Tythegston Long Barrow
 New House Long Barrow
 Heston Brake Long Barrow
 Thornwell Farm Long Barrow

Scotland
 Broadfold Cottage long barrow
 Capo Plantation long barrow
 Catto Long Barrow, Aberdeenshire
 Gerrieswells long barrow
 Herald Hill long barrow
 Longman Cairn long barrow
 Pitlurg long barrow

References